The 2021 Canadian Premier League Final was a soccer match which determined the winner of the 2021 Canadian Premier League season. It was played on December 5, 2021, in Hamilton, Ontario, between Forge FC and Pacific FC. Those teams qualified as the winners of their first round playoff matches. Forge FC were the defending champions.

Pacific FC defeated Forge FC 1–0 to claim their first CPL title. Alessandro Hojabrpour scored the game's only goal in the 59th minute and was named man of the match. Winning the championship earned the club the right to compete in the 2022 CONCACAF League where they ultimately reached the round of 16.

Path to the Final

Playoff semi-final results

|}

Forge FC

Forge FC entered the Final as the two-time defending league champions, having defeated Cavalry FC in the 2019 Finals and HFX Wanderers FC in the 2020 Final. On October 26, Forge clinched a playoff berth while inactive and then secured 1st place in the regular season following a win on November 9. Forge advanced to the finals by defeating 4th ranked York United FC at home in the semi-finals.

Pacific FC

This was Pacific FC's first Final, improving from a fourth place finish in 2020. On October 24, they became the 2nd team to qualify for the playoffs by virtue of a York United draw against Atlético Ottawa. Pacific finished 3rd in the regular season and advanced to the finals by defeating 2nd ranked Cavalry FC on the road in the semi-finals.

Head-to-head
This was the fourth meeting of the year between the two clubs with Forge having won all of the previous three games. Forge had the advantage in the all-time series with 8 wins, 1 draw, and 0 losses.

Forge earned the right to host the Final by having the better overall record in the regular season. Pacific entered the match on two weeks of rest since their previous match in the CPL semi-final. Forge had played two CONCACAF League matches following the semi-final, including an away match in Honduras four days before the CPL Final.

Match details

Summary

Details

See also
 Canadian Premier League Finals
 2021 Canadian Championship Final

References

Final
Canadian Premier League Final
Sports competitions in Hamilton, Ontario